The fourth series of I'm a Celebrity...Get Me Out of Here! began on 21 November 2004 and ended on 6 December 2004. The programme ran for 16 days, one more than in the previous series (18 days if counting the day the celebrities arrived and the morning the finalists exited). The series was won by comedian Joe Pasquale, with Paul Burrell narrowly coming second by a 2% margin.

Contestants
11 contestants participated, one more than in the previous two series.

Results and elimination
 Indicates that the celebrity was immune from the vote
 Indicates that the celebrity received the most votes from the public
 Indicates that the celebrity received the fewest votes and was eliminated immediately (no bottom two)
 Indicates that the celebrity was named as being in the bottom two

Bushtucker Trials
The contestants take part in daily trials to earn food.

 The public voted for who they wanted to face the trial
 The contestants decided who did which trial
 The trial was compulsory and neither the public or celebrities decided who took part

Notes
 Natalie Appleton was initially selected to take part in this trial, but walked out before this and was replaced by Sheila Ferguson.
 This trial was previously competed 4 days ago.
 This trial was previously competed last series.

Star count

Daily summary

Day 1
On the day the celebrities arrived, they were split into two groups after making an initial journey to the jungle by helicopter, making this the first time ever that two different arrival routes were used.

The 'Air and Water' group consisted of Paul Burrell, Fran Cosgrave, Joe Pasquale and Nancy Sorrell. Initially, Janet Street Porter was to be part of this group instead of Paul but they were swapped around at the last minute. Also Brian Harvey was meant to be part of this group but could not following the death of his grandmother. The remaining four members skydived into the jungle before enduring a five-hour hike to the camp.

The 'Earth and Fire' group consisted of Sophie Anderton, Natalie Appleton, Antonio Fargas, Sheila Ferguson and Janet Street Porter. Initially, Paul Burrell was to be part of this group instead of Janet but they were swapped around at the last minute. These five celebrities took on a four-hour trek to the camp by horseback.

Day 2
The first bushtucker trial of the series was titled 'Stake Out' and was contested by Fran Cosgrave, Joe Pasquale and Antonio Fargas. They won four stars.

Day 3
The second bushtucker trial of the series was titled 'Canopy Calamity' and was contested by Natalie Appleton. She won seven stars.

Day 4
The third bushtucker trial of the series was titled 'Snake Strike' and was contested by Janet Street Porter. She won nine stars.

The first Celebrity Chest of the series was also held and was done by Paul Burrell and Joe Pasquale.

Day 5
The fourth bushtucker trial of the series was titled 'House of Pies' and was contested by Brian Harvey. He won two stars. Brian later mentioned it was the worst experience of his life.

When dinner was delivered that evening, it was brought along with Vic Reeves, making this the first time a celebrity has entered later than the first day.

Day 6
The fifth bushtucker trial of the series was titled 'Temple of Doom' and was contested by Paul Burrell. Paul had been shortlisted for the previous four trials. He won six stars.

In camp, tensions finally boiled over between Sophie Anderton and Natalie Appleton after the latter had refused to help build a treehouse the previous day in preparation for Vic Reeves' arrival.

Day 7
The sixth bushtucker trial of the series was titled 'Leap of Faith'. It was broadcast live and was contested by Natalie Appleton. She won two stars, quitting early on complaining of feeling sick.

Brian Harvey walked out that evening following a massive spat at dinner with Janet Street Porter.

"You're cooking dinner! You're f**king over there, I'm over there (points away). Don't keep f**king having a go at me about farting!...Just because you think it's wrong doesn't mean everyone else thinks it's wrong. I'm farting because I need to f**king fart, because all I've eaten is f**king beans!... I take it very personal because you know that there's 16 million people watching!"
Brian Harvey's argument speech to Janet

Day 8
The seventh bushtucker trial of the series was titled 'Snap'. and was contested by Sophie Anderton and Natalie Appleton. They won a pasty bap and chips.

Day 9
The eighth bushtucker trial of the series was titled 'Slither River' and was contested by Natalie Appleton. She won five stars, again pulling out a comb complaining of tiredness, fear and weakness.

Day 10
Shortly after the public result of the next bushtucker trial vote was announced. Natalie Appleton finally threw in the towel and walked out after having been nominated.

The day's trial still went ahead, titled 'On Your Knees' and was contested by Sheila Ferguson, by virtue of having polled the next highest number of votes. She won six stars.

Day 11
Despite Natalie's departure, the live eviction still went ahead and Nancy Sorrell was eliminated.

The tenth bushtucker trial of the series was titled 'Hell-O-Copter'. Dubbed as the most dramatic and expensive trial ever staged, it was contested by Joe Pasquale. He won eight stars, the first time this series a celebrity won the maximum.

Day 12
Vic Reeves was the second celebrity to be eliminated. In his exited he said that if he had not left today, he would have pole-vaulted out of the jungle using his giant key (Reeves had kept it as a souvenir after it was used in a celebrity chest he took part in).

The eleventh bushtucker trial of the series was titled 'Fill Your Face' and was contested by Antonio Fargas. He won four stars. After the trial ended, he famously bluffed his words and said "There's a celebrity in my ear!". He meant to say there was a creature in his ear.

Day 13
Sheila Ferguson was the third celebrity to be eliminated.

The twelfth bushtucker trial of the series was titled 'Slither River 2' and was contested by Fran Cosgrave. This was previously attempted by Natalie four days ago. He won three stars.

Day 14
Antonio Fargas was the fourth celebrity to be eliminated.

The thirteenth bushtucker trial of the series was titled 'Hump It!' and was contested by Sophie Anderton and Janet Street Porter. They won three stars.

Day 15
Sophie Anderton was the fifth celebrity to be eliminated.

The fourteenth bushtucker trial of the series was titled 'Hell Holes' and was contested by Paul Burrell. He won all four stars. Fans of the show have labelled this as one of the most entertaining trials of all series, thanks to Paul's constant screaming and loathing.

Day 16
No celebrity was eliminated from camp today, to make up for Natalie's walkout earlier in the week.

The fifteenth bushtucker trial of the series was titled 'Hell Hill 2' and was contested by all four remaining celebrities. This trial was previously at this stage in the last series. Three stars were won.

Day 17
Janet Street Porter was the sixth celebrity to be eliminated. This meant Paul Burrell, Fran Cosgrave and Joe Pasquale would contest the final.

All three remaining celebs participated in one bushtucker trial each today, to win a fully prepared three course meal for dinner. Fran Cosgrave contested in 'Eel Helmet' for the starter course. Paul Burrell contested in 'Bushtucker Bonanza' for the main course and Joe Pasquale contested in 'Danger Down Under' for the dessert course. Each of them won the maximum of five stars.

Day 18
Joe Pasquale was crowned 'King of the Jungle' in the final vote. Paul Burrell was second and Fran Cosgrave was third.

Ratings
All ratings are taken from the UK Programme Ratings website, BARB.

References

2004 British television seasons
04